William Hay (21 January 1849 – 3 March 1925) was an English cricketer. He played three first-class matches for Marylebone Cricket Club between 1875 and 1877.

References

External links
 

1849 births
1925 deaths
English cricketers
Marylebone Cricket Club cricketers
Cricketers from Greater London
People from Great Bowden
Cricketers from Leicestershire
Gentlemen of England cricketers
Gentlemen of Marylebone Cricket Club cricketers